Closer to the Truth is the twenty-fifth studio album by American singer and actress Cher. It was released on September 20, 2013 by Warner Bros. Records. Opting to re-establish her music career, she began planning the project in 2011, shortly after her appearance in the movie Burlesque and the conclusion of her residency show at Caesars Palace. Work continued into 2012 and 2013. While the album was initially planned to be pop rock-oriented, Closer to the Truth ultimately became a prominently dance-inspired record. As executive producer, she enlisted longtime collaborator Mark Taylor to work alongside new producers such as Paul Oakenfold, Billy Mann, Timbaland and MachoPsycho to achieve Cher's desired sound.

Described by Cher as "very eclectic" and "her best album ever", Closer to the Truth is primarily a dance-pop record, yet it includes a broader range of various musical genres such as house, synth-pop, EDM, soft rock and country and contains influences by the music of the 1990s. The lyrical themes revolve largely around romance, feminism, individualism and self-empowerment. The album also features additional vocals and songwriting duties from several new partners, including singers Pink and Jake Shears.

The album received generally positive reviews from contemporary music critics, and was a success commercially, debuting and peaking at number three on the U.S. Billboard 200 with first-week sales of 63,000 copies, becoming Cher's highest-peaking solo album on that chart. However, with her album Dancing Queen (2018) debuting at number three on the Billboard 200 with sales of 153,000 copies in its first week, that record is now a tie. As of February 2014, Closer to the Truth has sold 285,000 copies in the country according to Nielsen SoundScan. It was certified gold by Music Canada and silver by BPI. It charted within the top ten in Canada, Germany, Russia, Scotland, the UK, and the US as well as moderately throughout several other international territories.

"Woman's World" was released as the lead single from Closer to the Truth on June 18, 2013, in the United States and Canada, and peaked at number one on the US Billboard Hot Dance Club Songs. The second single, "I Hope You Find It", was released on October 4, 2013, and charted strongly in several European national record charts. It was followed by singles "Take It Like a Man" and "I Walk Alone", both peaking at number two on the US Billboard Hot Dance Club Songs. Cher promoted Closer to the Truth with several television appearances and performances worldwide. She garnered widespread media attention when she declined the invitation to perform at the 2014 Winter Olympics because of Russia's anti-LGBT sentiments. Later, Cher embarked on her sixth concert tour titled the Dressed to Kill Tour on March 22, 2014.

Background and recording
Cher's last album, 2001's Living Proof, was supported by her record-breaking world tour, which ended in 2005. After a three-year hiatus, she began a Las Vegas residency and it was then that discussions of a new album began. In December 2008, she was said to be planning a record of 1960s covers, but in 2010 instead turned her attention to a movie comeback in Burlesque. For the film, she recorded two songs, "Welcome to Burlesque" and "You Haven't Seen the Last of Me". During promotion for Burlesque, Cher confirmed she was working on a new album in Nashville. The project's genre was described as southern rock and even country. However, after the success of "You Haven't Seen the Last of Me" on the US Hot Dance Club Songs chart (her seventh number one on that chart), the musical direction of the album changed to dance-oriented pop.

Cher collaborated with Diane Warren, Timbaland, Mark Taylor (who produced her 1998 hit, "Believe") and Kuk Harrell in putting the album together. In 2011, she recorded Lady Gaga's unreleased song, "The Greatest Thing", which was turned into a duet with Gaga and was produced by RedOne. Originally expected for release in September 2011, the song was eventually dropped from the album. A rough demo of the song was leaked on August 13, 2013.

Content
With the release of "Woman's World", Cher announced that the album's working title was Closer to the Truth. The track list includes "Lie to Me" and "I Walk Alone", both written by pop star Pink, and one featuring her vocals; "Take It Like a Man"; and a song written by Cher and Shirley Eikhard called "Lovers Forever". Originally intended for the soundtrack of the 1994 film Interview with the Vampire, it was recorded by Eikhard for her 2005 album Pop, and was produced for Closer to the Truth by Mark Taylor. Cher worked with hip-hop producer Timbaland on "I Don't Have to Sleep to Dream" and covered three songs: "Sirens" by singer-songwriter Nell Bryden, "Dressed to Kill" by Preston and "I Hope You Find It" by Miley Cyrus, from the soundtrack of the 2010 film The Last Song.

Three versions of the album were released. The original version of "You Haven’t Seen the Last of Me" from Burlesque is featured on the deluxe edition as a bonus track. Closer to the Truth was also released on white vinyl. This marks her first vinyl album release since 1991's Love Hurts and 1992's Greatest Hits: 1965–1992. According to critics reactions following an exclusive listening party on August 1, 2013, Closer to the Truth is "a healthy mix between punchy, uptempo dance tracks and big, emotional balladry", while the first half is "stacked with dance-floor anthems", and the latter features "mid-tempo songs and slower numbers, where the lyrics and melodies are highlighted".

Closer to the Truth was promoted a few times for its North America release of September 24, 2013, and in Europe for its worldwide unveiling a week later.

Singles and promotion

In October 2012, clips from the unannounced lead single leaked online. "Woman's World" was officially made available for online streaming on Thanksgiving 2012 and eventually released on June 18, 2013. Written by Matt Morris, Paul Oakenfold and Anthony Crawford, the single went to no. 1 on the Billboard dance chart. Cher performed it on the season finale of, The Voice; at New York City's gay pride event, Dance on the Pier; and at Macy's 4th of July spectacular. A music video, directed by Ray Kay, was released on August 20, 2013.

The second single, "I Hope You Find It", premiered on September 23, 2013 during Cher's Today Show concert, where she also performed "Woman's World" and "Believe". It was further performed on the Late Show with David Letterman on September 24, 2013, on Live! with Kelly and Michael on October 1, 2013, and on German TV show Wetten, dass..? on October 5, 2013. She then continued promotion of the single in the UK, performing on The X Factor on October 13, 2013, on The Graham Norton Show on October 18, 2013 and then on Vivement dimanche! in Paris on November 24, 2013. An official lyric video for the single was released on September 24, 2013. In 2014 "I Hope You Find It" debuted on Billboard'''s Adult Contemporary chart at number 24, becoming Cher's 31st entry on that chart during the course of five decades.

"Take It Like a Man" was released as a digital single with four remixes and an instrumental on November 8, 2013, in Germany and three days later worldwide. Cher garnered media attention with a music video for the 7th Heaven Remix, released on November 20, 2013. It features Andrew Christian underwear models as well as several gay porn stars, such as Antonio Biaggi. A remixes edition with eight further remixes of "Take It Like a Man" was released digitally on January 28, 2014. It peaked at number two on the US Dance Club Songs chart, as well as number nine on the US Hot Dance Singles Sales and number 23 on the US Hot Dance/Electronic Songs chart.

"Sirens" was included in the digitally-released album Songs for the Philippines, a fund-raising project for the victims of Typhoon Haiyan in the country.

"I Walk Alone" was sent to UK pop radio stations in early 2014. On March 14, 2014, Tracy Young's "Ferosh Reconstruction Remix" of "I Walk Alone" premiered on Billboard magazine's official website, being serviced to dance clubs and DJs the following week. An Extended play featuring nine remixes of "I Walk Alone" was released to digital retailers on April 25, 2014. It peaked at number two on the US Dance Club Songs Chart.

Dressed to Kill Tour
The Dressed to Kill Tour in support of Closer to the Truth, which launched on March 22, 2014, in Phoenix, Arizona, was officially announced on September 23, 2013. It is titled after the album's song of the same name. The tour went on to gross over $55 million and attracted over 600,000 fans.

Critical receptionCloser to the Truth garnered generally positive reviews from music critics. At Metacritic, which assigns a normalized rating out of 100 to reviews from mainstream critics, the album has an average score of 61 based on six reviews, indicating "generally favorable reviews". At USA Today, Jerry Shriver told that the release was "huge fun, lyrically substantive (as these things go) and emotionally wide-ranging, and it appeals beyond her fan base." Jim Farber of New York Daily News wrote that "The material isn't quite so individual", yet noted that "At root, the new disc pleases by this sole measure: It's deeply, madly Cher." At Newsday, Glenn Gamboa evoked that "Cher doesn't just survive here, she thrives." Kevin Catchpole of PopMatters affirmed that "Cher has provided a welcome return to the music world with Closer to the Truth."

John Hamilton of Idolator felt that the album "turns out to be one of Cher's most engaging albums, a strong collection of pop tunes the world would be wise to pick up." Gay Times felt that it was "a fantastic, if long-overdue, return from one of the greatest singers of our time." At So So Gay, Ed Brody highlighted that the release was "anything but a meek return to the spotlight for one of pop's most enduring and resilient emissaries", and proclaimed this was "a fantastically strong renaissance album." Bill Lamb of About.com called it "well balanced with the first half amounting to an uptempo dance suite and the second half explore more ballad territory."

However, AllMusic told that the album was "not terrible by any stretch, but the first half of the album is so much fun that this half suffers in comparison. An entire album of disco ball-shattering dance songs may have been too much and worn out its welcome." At The Montreal Gazette, Mark J. LePage felt that the release was "kind of like a miracle, and kind of sad and kind of heroic that it even exists." Slant Magazines Sal Cinquemani wrote that the album "not only perpetuates this exhausted (and exhausting) formula, but fails to attempt to reinvent it in even the most minute ways."

At The Guardian, Caroline Sullivan said that "The first half of the album is a similar campstravganza – Take It Like a Man indeed – but the second peters out into MOR." At The Boston Globe, Michael Andor Brodeur gave a mixed review, when he highlighted that the album was "presumably designed for the drive home from the club, seems to insist she’s more than a remix ingredient or Auto-tune fodder."

Commercial performance
In the United States, Closer to the Truth sold 63,000 copies in its first week of release and debuted at number three on the Billboard 200, becoming Cher's highest-charting solo album. However, with her album Dancing Queen (2018) debuting at number three on the Billboard 200 with sales of 153,000 copies, that record is now a tie. It spent three out of its first four weeks on the Billboard 200 within the top ten. As of February 2014 the album has sold over 285,000 copies in the US. In the UK the album debuted at number four, giving Cher her first top-five studio album there since 1991's Love Hurts, with 14,621 copies, and was still in the top ten the next two weeks selling respectively 8,281 and 7,829 copies, ultimately receiving a Silver certification by the BPI for the sales of over 60,000 copies. The album was certified Gold in Canada in November 2013 for the sales of 40,000 copies. As of March 2017 the album has sold 585,000 copies worldwide. The album was nominated for a World Music Award for World's Best Album.

Track listing
Credits adapted from the liner notes of Closer to the Truth.

Notes
 signifies an additional producer
 signifies a co-producer
 "Take It Like a Man" contains additional vocals from Jake Shears.
 "I Walk Alone" contains background vocals from Pink.

Personnel

Credits for Closer to the Truth'' adapted from AllMusic.

Josie Aiello – background vocals
Tom Barnes – composer, drums
Paul Barry – composer
Dario Brigham-Bowes – composer
Lorne Ashley Brigham-Bowes – composer, keyboards, programming
Greta Svabo Bech – composer
Gina Brooke – make-up
Nell Bryden – composer
Sandy Buglass – guitar
Rita Campbell – background vocals
Jon Castelli – mixing engineer
Jon Chen – A&R
Cher – composer, executive producer, primary artist
Bianca Claxton – background vocals
Ryan Corey – art direction, design
Anthony "TC" Crawford – additional production, composer
Josh Crosby – producer
Dario Darnell – keyboards, programming
Roger Davies – management
Justin Derrico – acoustic guitar
Shirley Eikhard – composer
Jeff Fenster – A&R, additional production
Serban Ghenea – mixing
Josh Gudwin – engineer, vocal engineer
John Hanes – engineer
Kuk Harrell – engineer, vocal engineer, vocal producer, background vocals
Wayne Hector – composer
Jeri Heiden – art direction, design
JP Jones – composer
Pete Kelleher – keyboards, background vocals
Peter Kelleher – composer
Ben Kohn – composer, guitar
Miguel Lara – assistant
Mary Leay – composer
Lee Levin – drums
Robin Lynch – composer, electric guitar
MachoPsycho – engineer, keyboard programming, producer
Marjan Malakpour – stylist
Billy Mann – arranger, composer, engineer, acoustic and electric guitar, keyboard programming, producer, background vocals
Stephen Marcussen – mastering
Patrick Mascall – composer, guitar
Tony Maserati – mixing
Machado Cicala Morassut – photography
Matt Morris – composer, background vocals
Ryan Nasci – assistant engineer
Marc Nelkin – composer
Chris "Tek" O'Ryan – engineer
Paul Oakenfold – composer, producer
Niklas "Nikey" Olovson – bass, composer
Jeanette Olsson – background vocals
Tebey Ottoh – composer
Deb Paull – personal assistant
Laura Pergolizzi – composer
Adam Phillips – guitar
Bonnie McKee – composer, background vocals
Pink – composer
Tim Powell – composer, keyboards, producer, programming
Sam Preston – composer, instrumentation
Steve Price – engineer
Serena Radaelli – hair stylist
Steve Robson – composer
Liz Rosenberg – publicity
Jennifer Ruiz – personal assistant
Carl Ryden – composer
Lindsay Scott – executive producer, management
Jake Shears – vocals
Robin Smith – string arrangements
Ash Soan – drums
Jeffrey Steele – composer
Ren Swan – engineer, mixing
Mark Taylor – composer, instrumentation, keyboards, producer, programming, vocal producer
TMS – producer
J.D. Walker – additional production, composer
Pete Wallace – arranger, bass, engineer, keyboard programming, keyboards
Dan Warner – electric guitar
Eric Weaver – engineer
Allen Wolfe – A&R
Jonathan Yudkin – composer, string arrangements, strings

Charts

Weekly charts

Year-end charts

Certifications and sales

Release history

References

External links
 
 

2013 albums
Cher albums
Warner Records albums
Albums produced by Mark Taylor (music producer)
Albums produced by Timbaland
Albums produced by TMS (production team)